Ackerman Boat Company was a wooden shipbuilding company in Newport Beach, California. Ackerman Boat Company built small barges in Newport Harbor working with Star D Iron Works, in Santa Ana. To support the World War 2 demand for ships Ackerman Boat Company shipyard switched over to military construction and built: US Army Harbor Tugboats and US Navy Landing Craft Mechanized Model LCM Mark 3. Clarence Ackerman started the Ackerman Boat Company was in 1943. Ackerman Boat Company worked with Consolidated Steel's Wilmington shipyard to build the Tugboat and Landing Craft.  Near the end of the war, Ackerman sold the yard to Consolidated Steel but purchased it back in 1947.  Ackerman sold the shipyard in 1958.  The shipyard was at 151 Shipyard Way, Newport Beach on the Lido Peninsula at the corner of Rhine Place.  The current site has been the Newport Harbor Shipyard since 1981, which repairs and restoration of yachts.

Notable ships
 Four HDML, Harbour Defence Motor Launch, Motor Launch that had a displacement of 46 tons, a length of 72-feet, crew of 10 men. Armed with one 3 or 4 pounder gun and four .303 AA guns. Had a top speed of 11 knots with a Diesel engine with 300 to 480 HP.
 Small US Army MTL Harbor Tugboats, 14 model 324-A with a length of 47 feet, a beam of 12 feet. MTL is for  Motor Towing Launch.
 Landing Craft Mechanized Mark 3, LCM (3) with a displacement of 52 tons full, 23 tons light. LCM(3) as a top speed of  full and  lite. Armed with two .50-cal M2 Browning machine guns, manned by a crew of 4. The cargo hold has a max capacity of one 30-ton tank (e.g.

 US Army TP Harbor Tug with displacement 185 tons gross, a length of 96 feet, a beam 25 feet, a draft of 11  feet, Power one Fairbanks–Morse six cylinder diesel engine to a single propeller with 450 shp. The TP Hull classification symbol is for "Tug/Passenger". The US Army had 43 of this 96-foot tugs built for World War 2, Ackerman Boat Company built 15 of them.

Ackerman Boat Company
Ackerman Boat Company boats built in 1943 and 1944:

Consolidated Steel
Consolidated Steel boats with Consolidated Steel hull #, built in 1945 and 1946:

Ackerman Boat Company
Ackerman Boat Company buit from 1944 to 1957:

See also
California during World War II
Maritime history of California
Peyton Company
South Coast Shipyard
Victory Shipbuilding
 Wooden boats of World War 2

References

American Theater of World War II
1940s in California
American boat builders